Murtaugh Peak is a sharp peak, 3,085 m, surmounting a ridge 4 nautical miles (7 km) west-northwest of Mount Minshew in the Wisconsin Range, Horlick Mountains, Antarctica. Mapped by United States Geological Survey (USGS) from surveys and U.S. Navy air photos, 1960–64. Named by Advisory Committee on Antarctic Names (US-ACAN) for John G. Murtaugh, geologist with the Ohio State University geological party to the Horlick Mountains, 1964–65.

Mountains of Marie Byrd Land